The Little Eachaig River is a watercourse in Argyll and Bute, Scotland. It is sourced in the hills near Glen Lean and largely runs parallel to the B836 road as it leads east to join the A815 road at Dalinlongart, near which the A815 crosses the river. Here it loops briefly to the north, before emptying into the Holy Loch at its head, just south of the River Eachaig, from which this river takes its name.

References

Little Eachaig
Cowal